Street Justice is a 1987 American action film directed by Richard C. Sarafian.

The plot involves CIA agent Curt Flynn (Michael Ontkean) who narrowly avoids death in a bombing, escapes from imprisonment by the Soviets, and returns to his New Jersey hometown. There he attempts to protect his wife Catherine (Joanna Kerns) from a corrupt family which controls the town.

Despite being set in New Jersey, the bulk of filming took place in Toronto.

Street Justice was Dukes of Hazzard star Catherine Bach's debut as a lead in a feature film.

Cast
 Michael Ontkean as Curt Flynn
 Joanna Kerns as Catherine Watson
 Catherine Bach as Tamarra
 J. D. Cannon as Dante
 Jeanette Nolan as Mrs. Chandler
 Richard Cox as Sam Chandler
 Sandee Currie as Mandy
 David B. Nichols as Ed Watson
 William Windom as Father Burke
 Alan Scarfe as Eugene Powers

Reception
From contemporary reviews, "Lor." of Variety called the film "a minor action drama", writing that a "good cast is mired in routine scripting." TV Guide criticized the film's script as "clumsy" and "loaded with lackluster dialog and stock characters." Leonard Maltin called it "slow, unconvincing, and instantly forgettable."

References

External links
 

1987 action films
1987 films
American action films
Films shot in Toronto
Films set in New Jersey
Warner Bros. films
Films directed by Richard C. Sarafian
1980s English-language films
1980s American films